Bullet for My Valentine is the first release by Welsh heavy metal band Bullet for My Valentine (not including EPs released as Jeff Killed John). It was released on 15 November 2004 through Visible Noise in the UK. The song "Hand of Blood" was released as a music video to promote the EP. The song "Cries in Vain" would later appear on the band's full-length debut, The Poison. This EP is not available on the U.S. version of iTunes.

All five songs would later be re-released in the US on Hand of Blood EP along with "4 Words (To Choke Upon)" (previously a Japanese bonus track) added to the beginning of the EP.

Track listing

Personnel
Bullet for My Valentine
 Matthew Tuck – lead vocals, rhythm guitar, guitar solo on track 1, bass guitar (uncredited)
 Michael "Padge" Paget – lead guitar, backing vocals
 Jason "Jay" James – bass guitar (credited but doesn't perform), backing vocals 
 Michael "Moose" Thomas – drums

Production
 Colin Richardson – production
 Dan Turner – engineer

Charts

References

Bullet for My Valentine albums
2004 EPs